The 2010–11 Northern Arizona Lumberjacks men's basketball team represented Northern Arizona University in the 2010–11 NCAA Division I men's basketball season. The Lumberjacks, led by head coach Mike Adras, played their home games at Rolle Activity Center in Flagstaff, Arizona, as members of the Big Sky Conference. The team was displaced from the Walkup Skydome, their usual home court, because of major renovations that began in December 2010, after the conclusion of football season.

The Lumberjacks finished 4th in the Big Sky Conference during the regular season, and were eliminated in the semifinals of the Big Sky tournament by tournament host and eventual conference champion Northern Colorado.

Northern Arizona failed to qualify for the NCAA tournament, but were invited to the 2011 CIT. The Lumberjacks lost in the first round of the CIT, where they were eliminated by the eventual champions Santa Clara, 68–63.

This was Mike Adras' last full season as head coach of the Lumberjacks. On December 6, 2011, Adras resigned following an internal investigation showed that he was responsible for multiple NCAA violations in the Northern Arizona program.

Roster 

Source

Schedule and results

|-
!colspan=9 style=|Exhibition

|-
!colspan=9 style=|Regular season

|-
!colspan=9 style=| Big Sky tournament

|-
!colspan=9 style=| CollegeInsider.com tournament

Source

References

Northern Arizona Lumberjacks men's basketball seasons
Northern Arizona
Northern Arizona
Northern Arizona men's basketball
Northern Arizona men's basketball